is a Japanese manga series written and illustrated by Kouji Seo. It was announced in April 2018, and ran in Kodansha's Weekly Shōnen Magazine from June 20, 2018 to February 17, 2021.<ref></p></ref><ref></p></ref> Kodansha collected its chapters in thirteen tankōbon volumes, released from October 17, 2018 to March 17, 2021. The series takes place in the same universe as several of the authors other series, including Suzuka, Kimi no Iru Machi (A Town Where You Live), and Fuuka.  It follows Kenzaki Ryuunosuke as he becomes a manga editor and aims to make author Takanashi Tsubasa the number one author in Japan.



Volumes list

References

Hitman